Sfiha or sfeeha is a dish consisting of flatbread cooked with a minced meat topping, often lamb flavored with onion, tomato, pine nuts, and spices. It is traditionally found in the countries of the Levant, and is closely related to manakish and lahmacun.

Sfiha has become popular in Brazil and Argentina, where it is known as esfiha or esfirra in Brazil or as sfija in Argentina, after being introduced by immigrants from Syria,Armenia and Lebanon.

History 
Flatbreads have been present in the Fertile Crescent since prehistoric times. They have been cooked on hot surfaces such as stones, a metal sajj plate, taboon, or tandoor. In the medieval Arab world, with the development of the brick oven or furn, a wide variety of flatbreads baked together with stuffings or toppings emerged, including sfiha, and spread across the Ottoman Empire.

In Brazil, esfiha gained popularity in the late 20th century, and since has become one of the most popular fast foods.

Main ingredients 
Every family has their own preference on what to add in addition to the meat. In Lebanon, the main ingredients are: meat, onions, tomatoes, pine nuts, salt, pepper, and flavorings such as cinnamon, sumac, or pomegranate molasses. The region of Baalbek is especially known for its sfiha. In Syria, Palestine, and Jordan, sfiha is similarly made with minced meat or lamb, in addition to herbs and spices, with tomatoes, onions, and other ingredients.

Esfihas in Brazil are oven baked and may be open-faced flatbreads about 4 inches in diameter with meat topping, or folded into a triangular pastry like fatayer. They may have various toppings, including cheese, curd, lamb, beef or vegetables.

See also
 List of lamb dishes
 List of flatbreads
 Lahmajoun
 Taboon bread

References

 

Arab cuisine
Brazilian cuisine
Iraqi cuisine
Jordanian cuisine
Lebanese cuisine
Palestinian cuisine
Syrian cuisine
Lamb dishes
Israeli cuisine
Flatbreads